The 1949 BAA playoffs was the postseason tournament following the Basketball Association of America 1948–49 season, its third and last. Later that year the BAA and National Basketball League merged to create the National Basketball Association or NBA. The tournament concluded with the Western Division champion Minneapolis Lakers defeating the Eastern Division champion Washington Capitols 4 games to 2 in the BAA Finals.

The eight qualified teams began tournament play on Tuesday and Wednesday, March 22 and 23, and the Finals concluded on Wednesday, April 13. Minneapolis and Washington played 10 and 11 games in a span of 22 days; their six final games in ten days. Prior to their final series, however, Minneapolis had been idle for five days, Washington for only one day.

Playoff seeds

Eastern Division
 Washington Capitols
 New York Knicks
 Baltimore Bullets
 Philadelphia Warriors

Western Division
 Rochester Royals
 Minneapolis Lakers
 Chicago Stags
 St. Louis Bombers

Playoff bracket

Division Semifinals

Eastern Division Semifinals

(1) Washington Capitols vs. (4) Philadelphia Warriors

This was the first playoff meeting between these two teams.

(2) New York Knicks vs. (3) Baltimore Bullets

This was the second playoff meeting between these two teams, with the Bullets winning the first meeting.

Western Division Semifinals

(1) Rochester Royals vs. (4) St. Louis Bombers

This was the first playoff meeting between these two teams.

(2) Minneapolis Lakers vs. (3) Chicago Stags

This was the first playoff meeting between these two teams.

Division Finals

Eastern Division Finals

(1) Washington Capitols vs. (2) New York Knicks

This was the first playoff meeting between these two teams.

Western Division Finals

(1) Rochester Royals vs. (2) Minneapolis Lakers

This was the first playoff meeting between these two teams.

BAA Finals: (W2) Minneapolis Lakers vs. (E1) Washington Capitols

This was the first playoff meeting between these two teams.

References

External links
 1949 Playoff Results at NBA.com
 1949 BAA Playoffs at Basketball-Reference.com

Playoffs
Basketball Association of America playoffs

it:Basketball Association of America 1948-1949#Play-off
fi:BAA-kausi 1948–1949#Pudotuspelit